Ernest Collinge (5 December 1895 – 15 December 1960) was an English footballer who played as a half-back for Port Vale in the 1920s. He was the elder brother of Tom Collinge.

Career
Collinge joined Port Vale in May 1921, and made his debut in a Potteries derby match against Stoke in the North Staffordshire Infirmary Cup final on 9 May, which Vale lost 5–3. He scored five goals (all penalties) in 41 Second Division appearances in the 1921–22 season, and also featured again in the North Staffordshire Infirmary Cup. He was an ever-present for the 1922–23 campaign, claiming three league goals, including one in a 2–1 victory over Manchester United at Old Trafford. He played just 19 games in the 1923–24 season, as he fractured his left leg in January, though made a speedy recover and was back in action five months later. He played 32 league and cup games in the 1924–25 campaign and dislocated his right arm in February 1925. His career at The Old Recreation Ground was effectively finished, and he retired at the close of the 1925–26 campaign after playing just 14 games that season.

Career statistics
Source:

References

1895 births
1960 deaths
Footballers from Manchester
People from Blackley
English footballers
Association football defenders
Port Vale F.C. players
English Football League players